The Kinneret Academic College on the Sea of Galilee (Hebrew: המכללה האקדמית כנרת בעמק הירדן), also known as Kinneret College and Academic Kinneret (As part of rebranding in February 2019), is a college located on the southern shores of the Sea of Galilee in northern Israel.

History
The College was established in 1965 by Emek HaYarden Regional Council as a secondary school named Emek HaYarden Regional College for the people of the Jordan Valley and the Galilee region, which is reflected in the multi-cultural and multi-faith background of the student population: Jewish and Arab, secular and religious. Upon its establishment, the College allowed the locals to study on the afternoons and evenings, while maintaining their chores and routine assignments. Furthermore, the College conducted bachelor's degree completion studies for local tutors, since the College was affiliated with Bar Ilan University, as well as a curriculum for an engineer's degree, courtesy of the Technion, up until the inauguration of Achi Racov School of Engineering, in 2012.

Prior to the inauguration of its first official building, in October 1974, the College was operating from the Avraham Haft Youth Center in Samakh. In 1983, the College established a preparatory school, which combined studies with work in the kibbutzim of the area (Afikim, Masada, Degania Alef, Degania Bet, etc.), though nowadays the prep school's program no longer includes such working.

In its first year, the College had 60 students enrolled to its study programs. By 1969, 300 students were accounted for enrolling. About 450 students, by 1971. And from 1974, the college was educating about 500 students, which has been increasing every year since.

Academic Units and Facilities

School of Humanities and Social Science 
 Tourism and Hotel Management (As of 2004)
 Communication studies (As of 2009)
 Behavioural sciences (As of 2010)
 Land of Israel studies (As of 2010)
 Education and Community
 Interdisciplinarity
Human Resources Management

Achi Racov School of Engineering 
 Water Industry Engineering(As of 2010)
 Electrical and Electronic Engineering (As of 2004)
 Software Engineering (As of 2004)
  Gas and Petroleum Energy Engineering (As of 2004)
 Reliability and Quality engineering for the electronics industry. The department works in cooperation with the Israel Society for Quality, which organizes conferences and professional seminars on campus (As of 2010).
The unit's curriculum received a rating of "High Achievement" by the Technological Preparation Institute from the Ministry of Labor.

Kinneret Innovation Center for Entrepreneurship 

Inaugurated in February 2019, the Center helps qualitative graduates with job application in the fields of Agricultural engineering and Biological engineering. The Innovation Center works in cooperation with Zemach Regional Industries, Emek HaYarden Regional Council, and Baruch Padeh Medical Center, as a greenhouse for high tech companies who are willing to help with the economical development of the Jordan Valley.

Research and Development Institutes 

Kinneret Institute for Galilean Archaeology

Founded by Dr. Mordechai Aviam in 2005, and absorbed into the College in 2009, the institute works in cooperation with The Sue and Leonard Miller Center for Contemporary Judaic Studies of the University of Miami, since 2008. The historic-archaeologic aspect of the Galilee has been the main purpose of research for the institute, which is reflected on events, such as the Jesus movement, the First Jewish–Roman War and the composition of the Talmud and the Mishnah, including the big concentration of ancient synagogues and Christian holy sites in the area.

Dan Shomron Institute for Society, Security and Peace Research

The Institute studies the economical, cultural, strategic and political aspects of the interactions between the Israeli society and all forms of security in the state, as well as their consequences.

The Bornblum Academic Department for Land of Israel Research

Inaugurated in December 2006, the establishment of the Department is a part of the expansion and academization process of Israeli colleges into the field of institutionalized research.

Science and Knowledge Center for Gifted and Outstanding students

Inaugurated in 1998, the Center operates on the behalf of the Ministry of Education, and teaches 200 gifted students, and 120 outstanding students, on average, all elementary school aged. The students are directed from towns and settlements of nearby areas, such as the Jordan Rift Valley, the southern Golan Heights and Afula.

Since 2004, the College has independent academic status and awards degrees in several fields of Engineering, Social Sciences and Humanities, including Media Studies and Tourism Management.

Human trafficking

Kinneret College and a subcontractor called Sachlav have been accused of luring foreign students from Asian and African countries to Israel under the guise of an eleven-month bachelor programme in business administration and agriculture. In fact, the students became victims of human trafficking and slavery. Kinneret College and Sachlav act as placement agencies for farmers in northern Israel. For the farmers, the programmes are a way to obtain foreign workers disguised as students. African students at Tel Aviv University reported similar experiences.

See also
List of universities and colleges in Israel
Education in Israel

References

External links
Kinneret College (Hebrew version)

Colleges in Israel
Educational institutions established in 1965
1965 establishments in Israel
Sea of Galilee